Désirée "Ellie" Cachette (born March 17, 1985) is an American investor, philanthropist and author of Software Agreements for Dummies. Cachette resides in Miami, Florida.

Early life and education
Born in Martinez, California, Cachette was raised with her father who contracted HIV in the early-1980s as part of a group of Hemophiliacs who were infected by recalled pharmaceutical products. The recall affected 20,000 American hemophiliacs and 100,000 worldwide and settled in 1997 for 660 million dollars in damages to be paid to over 6,000 victims by Bayer Pharmaceutical and three other companies. A single father, Terry Stogdell raised Cachette for most of her childhood before his death due to AIDS complications in 2002. A notable AIDS activist, Stogdell was well-regarded as a public health advocate and part of the founding medical marijuana movement and crucial to gain support of 1996 California Proposition 215. Before his death, Stogdell testified as a part of United States v. Oakland Cannabis Buyers' Cooperative in support of legalizing cannabis for medicinal purposes in the state of California.

At the age of fourteen Cachette received an award from the California State Senate for her efforts in public health initiatives. In 2003 at the age of seventeen Cachette received a scholarship for her work in community health from KRON-TV called "Beating the Odds." She earned a Bachelor of Arts degree in political science from Humboldt State University in 2006, graduating one year earlier than her class. In 2013 Cachette was awarded Notable Alumni by Humboldt State. She currently serves as an advisor to Humboldt endowment programs.

Career
Cachette is a fund manager and investor in the venture capital space, her career starting in technical project management evolving to startup founder in 2010, then venture consulting  and estimated to have switched full time to venture capital in 2016. In 2018 Cachette publicly discussed moving to Europe and launching an $1BN planned investment fund-of-funds  in September 2019 an article by Bloomberg  highlighted questionable actions by Cachette surrounding her investment company, Cachette Capital. Cachette has not publicly responded to the media piece directly, although she gave a keynote in Barranquilla, Colombia after in December 2019  and an interview in Romania January 2020. Cachette's fund is not open to the public and said to have investments dating back to 2018.

In March 2020 Cachette released an industry paper on the nuances of European venture capital growth and attributed most asset anomalies in Europe to investments being mainly backed by American capital yet recorded as "European growth". She regularly blogs about venture capital as an asset class and is an outspoken supporter of "democratizing capital."

Philanthropy
Cachette is a donor to Humboldt State University, Women2.0, Venture for America, Break The Cycle and multiple Jewish organizations. Cachette led a scholarship in her father's name at Humboldt State University with an endowment in the name of Terry L. Stogdell  said to provide scholarships to students pursuing public health.

In March 2021, Cachette who lives in Miami, donated funds for an investigative reporter in California backed by Jason Calcanis and found herself in controversy labeled as a "leader for ousting" 2021 San Francisco District Attorney Chesa Boudin quoting Cachette in Mother Jones as stating "VC Lives Matter" in response to the city spread initiative to Recall Chesa. Immediately after publication Cachette denounced the quote on social media saying it was misused along with her name; a local backlash ensued since Cachette is not a resident of San Francisco.

On March 25, 2022 Cachette represented by counsel Cozen O'Connor filed a lawsuit against Mother Jones in San Francisco, California. A public FOIA request specific to Mother Jones returned a connection between Mother Jones and Boudin's team.

Cachette posted a statement to her personal website  but has otherwise been silent on social media about the issue.

References

21st-century American non-fiction writers
21st-century American women writers
1985 births
Living people
American women philanthropists
21st-century philanthropists
21st-century American businesswomen
21st-century American businesspeople
Businesspeople from California
Philanthropists from California
Writers from California
American women non-fiction writers
California State Polytechnic University, Humboldt alumni
21st-century women philanthropists